Loose Shoes (also known as Coming Attractions and Quackers)  is a 1978 comedy film directed by  Ira Miller and featuring Bill Murray. The film is presented as a series of movie trailers with titles such as The Howard Huge Story, Skate-boarders from Hell and The Invasion of the Penis Snatchers.

The film was originally released on September 1, 1978 as Coming Attractions and promoted with the tagline "The Movie That Makes Fun of the Movies". It was re-released in 1980 under the title of Loose Shoes, capitalizing on the increased fame of Murray (Saturday Night Live, Meatballs) and Howard Hesseman (WKRP in Cincinnati).

The updated title is taken from a 1940s Cab Calloway-style song-and-dance number in the film's final skit, "Dark Town After Dark", which satirizes an infamous 1976 drunken, racist remark made by Gerald Ford's then-Secretary of Agriculture Earl Butz (who was subsequently forced to resign) on a plane: "I'll tell you what the coloreds want. It's three things: first, a tight pussy; second, loose shoes; and third, a warm place to shit".

Cast

External links

References

1980 films
1980s parody films
American parody films
1980s English-language films
1980 comedy films
Atlantic Entertainment Group films
1970s English-language films
1970s American films
1980s American films